Aralotherium is an extinct genus of hornless rhinoceros closely related to Paraceratherium, one of the largest terrestrial mammals that has ever existed.  It lived in China and Kazakhstan during the late Oligocene epoch (28–23 million years ago).  It is classified as a member of the Paraceratheriidae subfamily Paraceratheriinae.

Two species are known, A. prohorovi and A. sui.

References

Oligocene rhinoceroses
Chattian genus extinctions
Prehistoric placental genera
Chattian genus first appearances
Prehistoric rhinoceroses
Fossil taxa described in 1939